The 1997–98 Midland Football Alliance season was the fourth in the history of Midland Football Alliance, a football competition in England.

Clubs and league table
The league featured 18 clubs from the previous season, along with two new clubs:
Richmond Swifts, promoted from the Midland Football Combination, who also changed name to Kings Norton Town
Wednesfield, promoted from the West Midlands (Regional) League

League table

References

External links
 Midland Football Alliance

1997–98
8